Credibility theory is a branch of actuarial mathematics concerned with determining risk premiums. It is employed to combine multiple estimates into a summary estimate that takes into account information on the accuracy of the initial estimates. For example, in group health insurance an insurer is interested in calculating the risk premium, (i.e. the theoretical expected claims amount) for a particular employer in the coming year. The insurer will likely have an estimate of historical overall claims experience, as well as a more specific estimate for the employer in question, . Assigning a credibility factor, to the overall claims experience (and the reciprocal to employer experience) allows the insurer to get a more accurate estimate of the risk premium in the following manner:

The credibility factor is derived by calculating the maximum likelihood estimate which would minimise the error of estimate.

Therefore, the more uncertainty the estimate has, the lower is its credibility.

Types of Credibility
In Bayesian credibility, we separate each class (B) and assign them a probability (Probability of B).  Then we find how likely our experience (A) is within each class (Probability of A given B). Next, we find how likely our experience was over all classes (Probability of A).  Finally, we can find the probability of our class given our experience.  So going back to each class, we weight each statistic with the probability of the particular class given the experience.

Bühlmann credibility works by looking at the Variance across the population.  More specifically, it looks to see how much of the Total Variance is attributed to the Variance of the Expected Values of each class (Variance of the Hypothetical Mean), and how much is attributed to the Expected Variance over all classes (Expected Value of the Process Variance).  Say we have a basketball team with a high number of points per game.  Sometimes they get 128 and other times they get 130 but always one of the two.  Compared to all basketball teams this is a relatively low variance, meaning that they will contribute very little to the Expected Value of the Process Variance.  Also, their unusually high point totals greatly increases the variance of the population, meaning that if the league booted them out, they'd have a much more predictable point total for each team (lower variance). So, this team is definitely unique (they contribute greatly to the Variance of the Hypothetical Mean).  So we can rate this team's experience with a fairly high credibility.  They often/always score a lot (low Expected Value of Process Variance) and not many teams score as much as them (high Variance of Hypothetical Mean).

A simple example

Suppose there are two coins in a box.  One has heads on both sides and the other is a normal coin with 50:50 likelihood of heads or tails.  You need to place a wager on the outcome after one is randomly drawn and flipped.

The odds of heads is .5 * 1 + .5 * .5 = .75.  This is because there is a .5 chance of selecting the heads-only coin with 100% chance of heads and .5 chance of the fair coin with 50% chance.

Now the same coin is reused and you are asked to bet on the outcome again.

If the first flip was tails, there is a 100% chance you are dealing with a fair coin, so the next flip has a 50% chance of heads and 50% chance of tails.

If the first flip was heads, we must calculate the conditional probability that the chosen coin was heads-only as well as the conditional probability that the coin was fair, after which we can calculate the conditional probability of heads on the next flip. The probability that it came from a heads-only coin given that the first flip was heads is the probability of selecting a heads-only coin times the probability of heads for that coin divided by the initial probability of heads on the first flip, or .5 * 1 / .75 = 2/3.  The probability that it came from a fair coin given that the first flip was heads is the probability of selecting a fair coin times the probability of heads for that coin divided by the initial probability of heads on the first flip, or .5 * .5 / .75 = 1/3.  Finally, the conditional probability of heads on the next flip given that the first flip was heads is the conditional probability of a heads-only coin times the probability of heads for a heads-only coin plus the conditional probability of a fair coin times the probability of heads for a fair coin, or 2/3 * 1 + 1/3 * .5 = 5/6 ≈ .8333.

Actuarial credibility

Actuarial credibility describes an approach used by actuaries to improve statistical estimates. Although the approach can be formulated in either a frequentist or Bayesian statistical setting, the latter is often preferred because of the ease of recognizing more than one source of randomness through both "sampling" and "prior" information. In a typical application, the actuary has an estimate X based on a small set of data, and an estimate M based on a larger but less relevant set of data. The credibility estimate is ZX + (1-Z)M, where Z is a number between 0 and 1 (called the "credibility weight" or "credibility factor") calculated to balance the sampling error of X against the possible lack of relevance (and therefore modeling error) of M.

When an insurance company calculates the premium it will charge, it divides the policy holders into groups. For example, it might divide motorists by age, sex, and type of car; a young man driving a fast car being considered a high risk, and an old woman driving a small car being considered a low risk. The division is made balancing the two requirements that the risks in each group are sufficiently similar and the group sufficiently large that a meaningful statistical analysis of the claims experience can be done to calculate the premium. This compromise means that none of the groups contains only identical risks. The problem is then to devise a way of combining the experience of the group with the experience of the individual risk to calculate the premium better. Credibility theory provides a solution to this problem.

For actuaries, it is important to know credibility theory in order to calculate a premium for a group of insurance contracts. The goal is to set up an experience rating system to determine next year's premium, taking into account not only the individual experience with the group, but also the collective experience.

There are two extreme positions. One is to charge everyone the same premium estimated by the overall mean  of the data. This makes sense only if the portfolio is homogeneous, which means that all risks cells have identical mean claims. However, if the portfolio is heterogeneous, it is not a good idea to charge a premium in this way (overcharging "good" people and undercharging "bad" risk people) since the "good" risks will take their business elsewhere, leaving the insurer with only "bad" risks. This is an example of adverse selection.

The other way around is to charge to group   its own average claims, being  as premium charged to the insured. These methods are used if the portfolio is heterogeneous, provided a fairly large claim experience. To compromise these two extreme positions, we take the weighted average of the two extremes:

 

 has the following intuitive meaning: it expresses how "credible" (acceptability) the individual of cell  is.

If the group were completely homogeneous then it would be reasonable to set , while if the group were completely heterogeneous then it would be reasonable to set .  Using intermediate values is reasonable to the extent that both individual and group history is useful in inferring future individual behavior.

For example, an actuary has an accident and payroll historical data for a shoe factory suggesting a rate of 3.1 accidents per million dollars of payroll. She has industry statistics (based on all shoe factories) suggesting that the rate is 7.4 accidents per million. With a credibility, Z, of 30%, she would estimate the rate for the factory as 30%(3.1) + 70%(7.4) = 6.1 accidents per million.

References

Further reading
Behan, Donald F. (2009) "Statistical Credibility Theory", Southeastern Actuarial Conference, June 18, 2009
Longley-Cook, L.H. (1962) An introduction to credibility theory PCAS, 49, 194-221.

Whitney, A.W. (1918) The Theory of Experience Rating, Proceedings of the Casualty Actuarial Society, 4, 274-292 (This is one of the original casualty actuarial papers dealing with credibility. It uses Bayesian techniques, although the author uses the now archaic "inverse probability" terminology.)
Venter, Gary G. (2005) "Credibility Theory for Dummies"

Actuarial science
Credit risk